Muellerella lichenicola is a species of lichenicolous fungus in the family Verrucariaceae. It was first formally described as a new species in 1826 by Søren Christian Sommerfelt, as Sphaeria lichenicola. David Leslie Hawksworth transferred it to the genus Muellerella in 1979.

It has been reported growing on Caloplaca aurantia, Caloplaca saxicola and Physcia aipolia in Sicily, and on an unidentified crustose lichen in Iceland. In Mongolia, it has been reported growing on the thallus of a Biatora-lichen at  elevation in the Bulgan district and on Aspicilia at  elevation in the Altai district.  In Victoria Land, Antarctica, it has been reported from multiple hosts, including members of the Teloschistaceae and Physciaceae.

References

Verrucariales
Fungi described in 1826
Fungi of Iceland
Fungi of Asia
Lichenicolous fungi
Fungi of Europe